Duncan MacAllister McGuire (born February 5, 2001) is an American soccer player who plays as a forward for Major League Soccer club Orlando City.

Early career
Born in Omaha, Nebraska, McGuire prepped at Creighton Preparatory School where he was a two-time Omaha World-Herald All-Nebraska First Team selection (2018 and 2019) and was chosen to play at the 2019 Nebraska High School Soccer Senior Showcase. He played club soccer for Elkhorn SC.

Creighton Bluejays
Having attended the program's youth summer camps for a decade, McGuire committed to playing college soccer at Creighton University. He played three seasons for the Creighton Bluejays between 2019 and 2022, redshirting as a freshman in 2019. With the 2020 season delayed until early 2021 because of the COVID-19 pandemic, McGuire eventually made his collegiate debut on February 20, 2021, away to Marquette Golden Eagles. He was one of six players to appear in all 12 matches during the season, making four starts, scoring four goals and three assists, and was named to the All-Big East Second Team. He made a further 19 appearances as a redshirt sophomore, making five starts and scoring five goals. 2022 proved a breakout year for McGuire. He played in all 24 matches, starting in all but one, and scored 23 goals, the most in the nation and a new Bluejays single season record. Six of his goals came as Creighton won the 2022 Big East Conference men's soccer tournament and McGuire was named tournament offensive MVP. Creighton also made a run to the NCCA College Cup semi-finals, losing to eventual champions Syracuse Orange 3–2. Individually McGuire was named Big East Offensive Player of the Year, TopDrawerSoccer.com National Player of the Year, and was awarded the Hermann Trophy. He became the first Creighton Bluejay to win the honor since McGuire's head coach Johnny Torres in 1997.

Professional career
McGuire played the 2022 USL League Two season with Lane United. He made 11 appearances and scored four goals.

On December 21, 2022, McGuire was selected in the first round (6th overall) of the 2023 MLS SuperDraft by Orlando City. He was officially announced as a new signing by Orlando on February 22, 2023.

Career statistics

College

Club

Honors
Creighton Bluejays
Big East Tournament: 2022

Individual
Big East Offensive Player of the Year: 2022
TopDrawerSoccer.com National Player of the Year: 2022
Hermann Trophy: 2022

References

External links
 Duncan McGuire at Creighton University Athletics

2001 births
Living people
Soccer players from Nebraska
American soccer players
Association football forwards
Creighton Bluejays men's soccer players
Hermann Trophy men's winners
All-American men's college soccer players
Orlando City SC draft picks
Lane United FC players
USL League Two players
Orlando City SC players